Mehdi Abdesmad (born September 28, 1991) is a Canadian-born former American football defensive end. He played college football at Boston College.

Professional career

Tennessee Titans
Abdesmad went undrafted in the 2016 NFL draft. He was signed by the Tennessee Titans on April 30, 2016. On September 4, 2016, he was released by the Titans and was signed to the practice squad the next day. He was promoted to the active roster on December 12, 2016. He was placed on injured reserve on December 28, 2016. As a rookie in 2016, he played two games making one tackle. He was waived on August 21, 2017.

Tampa Bay Buccaneers
On August 28, 2017, Abdesmad signed with the Tampa Bay Buccaneers. He was waived on September 2, 2017.

References

External links
Boston College Eagles bio

Living people
1991 births
Sportspeople from Montreal
Canadian players of American football
American football defensive ends
Boston College Eagles football players
Tennessee Titans players
Tampa Bay Buccaneers players